In chess and other related games, a double check is a check delivered by two pieces simultaneously. In chess notation, it is almost always represented the same way as a single check ("+"), but is sometimes symbolized by "++". (The symbol "++", however, is also sometimes used to denote checkmate.) This article uses "++" for double check and "#" for checkmate.

Chess

The most common form of double check involves one piece moving to deliver check and revealing a discovered check at the same time from a piece it had been blocking. The only possible reply to a double check is a king move, as it is impossible to block or capture both checking pieces at once (though the king move may capture one of these pieces).

In exceptional circumstances, it is possible for the moved piece in a double check to not give check. The only way for this to happen in orthodox chess is by way of an en passant capture. In the position shown from Gundersen–Faul, 1928, Black has just played 14...g7–g5. White replies 15.hxg6 #. The result is a double check even though the white pawn does not give check: one check is given by the rook, discovered by the capturing pawn's move; the other by the bishop, revealed by the captured pawn's removal. Such a double check is extremely rare in practical play, but it is sometimes found in chess problems.

Game examples
A double check is a part of the smothered mate pattern known as Philidor's legacy.

Aron Nimzowitsch wrote, "Even the laziest king flees wildly in the face of a double check." Because the only possible response to a double check is a king move, the double check is often an important tactical motif. A famous example is Réti–Tartakower, Vienna 1910, which arose after: 
1. e4 c6 2. d4 d5 3. Nc3 dxe4 4. Nxe4 Nf6 5. Qd3 e5 6. dxe5 Qa5+ 7. Bd2 Qxe5 8. 0-0-0 Nxe4 (diagram) 9. Qd8+
 
Réti sacrifices a queen in order to set up a double check.
9... Kxd8 10. Bg5++ 

White mates after 10...Ke8 11.Rd8 or 10...Kc7 11.Bd8#.

A double check was also seen in the celebrated Evergreen Game, Anderssen–Dufresne, 1852. Anderssen won with:
20. Rxe7+! Nxe7 21.Qxd7+!!
A queen sacrifice to set up a deadly double check.

21... Kxd7 22. Bf5++ Ke8
Or 22...Kc6 23.Bd7#.

23. Bd7+ Kf8 24. Bxe7#

Variants

In chess with variant rules or fairy pieces, other ways of delivering a double check may be possible. Triple, quadruple and even quintuple checks may also be possible. For example, in the position shown, after Black plays 1...d5, White plays 2.exd6e.p.+++++ (the moa is a non-leaping knight which first takes a diagonal step, then an orthogonal one; the grasshopper captures by leaping over an intervening piece). After the en passant capture, five pieces check the black king: both moas, the rook, the grasshopper and the bishop.

Xiangqi
In xiangqi, the Chinese version of chess, triple check and even quadruple check are possible, as in the following examples:

References

Chess terminology

de:Abzug (Schach)#Doppelschach
sv:Schacka#Dubbelschack